is a child vocaloid character produced by AH-Software Co. Ltd and released originally for Vocaloid 2.

Development
Her voice is taken from recordings of an actual elementary school student, though the student is unknown.

AH-Software also announced that they would be selling their vocals in Germany, with Yuki being destined to be the first sold there.

Additional software
Silhouettes of the AH-Software VOCALOIDs were revealed on a poster on November 6, 2014, but it was unconfirmed what they were for at the time. On November 20, it was confirmed in the livestream for Vocaloid 4 that they all, with the exception of Tohoku Zunko, would receive Vocaloid 4 updates.  It was later confirmed that due to Yuki's original voice provider maturing, possible growl samples would be recorded from a new voice provider. On September 30, Yuki was confirmed to only receive a Natural voicebank, which could be purchased on its own or in a starter package. Her release date was announced to be October 29, 2015.

In an interview, Tomohide Ogata expressed a desire to produce English versions of their Vocals, however, the project is too complex.  He went on to explain that because all of their providers are Japanese, they would rather seek English speakers of a similar voice to the Japanese versions from the United States and United Kingdom.

Characteristics
She and Hiyama Kiyoteru were released as "student" and "teacher" vocals.

Yuki is meant to be portrayed as a 9 year old elementary school student. She is said to be "As tall as 10 big apples" and "As heavy as 86 apples". Her red randoseru is a motif of YAMAHA's wind controller, WX5.

See also
 List of Vocaloid products

References

Vocaloids introduced in 2009
Fictional singers
Japanese idols
Japanese popular culture